The 2008 Moscow Victory Parade was held on Victory Day (9 May) on the occasion of the 63rd anniversary of the Great Patriotic War ending in the defeat of Nazi Germany. This was the first time the Russian Federation opened its vehicle showcase since 1991, and the airshow since the Cold War. The parade was commanded by Army General Vladimir Bakin, Commander of the Moscow Military District, and reviewed by Anatoliy Serdyukov of the Russian Ministry of Defence. A speech was made by Russian president Dmitry Medvedev, who took office just two days prior. This would be notable to be the first ever major Russian military parade seen on television worldwide when RT carried a live broadcast of the parade for the first time in its history.

Parade Program

Parade formations 
Note: Those indicated in bold indicate first parade appearance, those indicated with italic indicate double or multiple parade appearances.

General of the Army Vladimir Bakin, Commander of the Moscow Military District (parade commander)
 Defense Minister of the Russian Federation Anatoliy Serdyukov (parade inspector)

Military Bands in Attendance 

 Massed Military Bands led and conducted by Major General Valery Khalilov and composed of:
 Headquarters Band of the Moscow Military District
Central Military Band of the MDRF
Central Band of the Russian Navy
 Band of the Moscow Military Conservatoire, Military University of the Ministry of Defense of the Russian Federation
 HQ Band of the Ministry of Emergency Situations of the Russian Federation
 Corps of Drums of the Moscow Military Music College

Infantry Column 

154th Moscow Garrison Commandant's Honor Guard Regiment and Color Guards
 Colors Party composed of:
Flag of Russia
Victory Banner
 Banner of the Armed Forces of the Russian Federation
 Combined Honor Guard Company of the Armed Forces
 Historical units
 Representative units of the Armed Forced, Ministry of Internal Affairs, Ministry of Emergency Situations and Civil Defense, Federal Security Service as well as units of the Moscow Military District
Combined Arms Academy of the Armed Forces of the Russian Federation
Peter the Great Military Academy of the Strategic Missile Forces
Military University of the Ministry of Defense of the Russian Federation
Gagarin Air Force Academy
Zhukovsky Air Force Engineering Academy
Civil Defense Academy of the Ministry of Emergency Situations of the Russian Federation
Military Technological University
Moscow Military Space Institute of Radio Electronics
Moscow Border Guards Institute of the Border Guard Service of the Federal Security Service of the Russian Federation "Moscow City Council"
2nd Guards Motor Rifle Division
4th Kantemir Guards Armored Brigade "Yuri Andropov"
27th Sevastopol Guards Motor Rifle Brigade
Ryazan Airborne Command Academy "Gen. of the Army Vasily Margelov"
98th Guards Airborne Division
ODON Ind. Motorized Internal Troops Division of the Ministry of Internal Affairs of the Russian Federation "Felix Dzerzhinsky"
Baltic Naval Military Institute "Admiral Fyodor Ushakov"
336th Separate Bialystok Guards Naval Infantry Brigade of the Baltic Fleet
Nakhimov Naval School
Suvorov Military School
Moscow Military Commanders Training School "Supreme Soviet of the RSFSR/Russian Federation"

With more than 9,000 soldier, sailors, and airmen and 100 vehicles marching in the parade, this was the largest such parade held in Russia since the fall of the Soviet Union. Unlike previous Victory Day parades, there were no units parading in Great Patriotic War uniforms, though the Victory Banner was paraded at the beginning of the ceremony. Training for the parade took two months in Alabino, Moscow Oblast. On 8 May, a temporary platform with a white-blue-red banner was erected on Red Square, covering the Lenin Mausoleum .

Ground vehicles at the Parade 

This was the first time in the history of post-Soviet Russia when armoured fighting vehicles took part in the Red Square parade. In order of presentation:
 Advanced guard flag group by three UAZ-469s
 GAZ-2975
 BTR-80
 BMP-3
 BMD-4
 2S25 Sprut-SD
 T-90
 2S19 Msta
 9K22 Tunguska
 Tor Missile System
 Buk-M1-2
 BM-30 Smerch
 S-300
 Iskander M
 RT-2PM Topol
 Rear guard flag group by three UAZ-469s
On 22 April, the equipment was delivered to a training ground near Moscow. Before the parade, the tracked vehicles were delivered by rail. Due to the fact that in 1995 the Resurrection Gates were restored, military equipment entered the square on from one side of the State Historical Museum, and not from two as in previous parades.

Aircraft at the Parade 

In order of presentation:
 3 Mil Mi-8 (with flags)
 Antonov An-124 and 2 Sukhoi Su-27
 Tupolev Tu-160 and 2 Mikoyan MiG-31
 Tupolev Tu-95, Ilyushin Il-78 and 2 Mikoyan MiG-29 (Il-78 and Tu-95 were imitating aerial refueling)
 Ilyushin Il-78, Sukhoi Su-24, Sukhoi Su-34, also imitating aerial refueling. The Su-34s came from the 4th Centre for Combat Employment and Retraining of Personnel at Lipetsk air base.
 3 Tupolev Tu-22M
 4 Sukhoi Su-25
 5 Sukhoi Su-27 and 4 Mikoyan MiG-29 (Russian Knights and Strizhi)

Music 

 Inspection and Address
 March of the Preobrazhensky Regiment (Марш Преображенского Полка)
 Slow March of the Tankmen (Встречный Марш Танкистов) by Semyon Tchernetsky
 Slow March to Carry the War Flag (Встречный Марш для выноса Боевого Знамени) by Dmitriy Valentinovich Kadeyev
 Slow March of the Guards of the Navy (Гвардейский Встречный Марш Военно-Морского Флота) by Nikolai Pavlocich Ivanov-Radkevich
 Slow March of the Officers Schools (Встречный Марш офицерских училищ) by Semyon Tchernetsky
 Slow March (Встречный Марш) by Dmitry Pertsev
 Slow March of the Red Army (Встречный Марш Красной Армии) by Semyon Tchernetsky
 Slow March (Встречный Марш) by Evgeny Aksyonov
 Glory (Славься) by Mikhail Glinka
 Parade Fanfare All Listen! (Парадная Фанфара "Слушайте все!") by Andrei Golovin
 State Anthem of the Russian Federation (Государственный Гимн Российской Федерации) by Alexander Alexandrov
 Signal Retreat (Сигнал "Отбой")

 Infantry Column
 General Miloradovich (Марш "Генерал Милорадович") by Valery Khalilov
 Farewell of Slavianka (Прощание Славянки) by Vasiliy Agapkin
 To Serve Russia (Служить России) by Eduard Cemyonovich Khanok
 Lefort's March (Лефортовский Марш) by Valery Khalilov
 Artillery March (Марш Артиллеристов) by Tikhon Khrennikov
 Combat March (Строевой Марш) by Dmitry Illarionovich Pertsev
 Air March (Авиамарш) by Yuliy Abramovich Khait
 In Defense of the Homeland (В защиту Родины) by Viktor Sergeyevich Runov
 March of the Cosmonauts/Friends, I believe (Марш Космонавтов /Я верю, друзья) by Oskar Borisovich Feltsman
 March Kant (Марш "Кант") by Valery Khalilov
 On Guard for the Peace (На страже Мира) by Boris Alexandrovich Diev
 We Need One Victory (Нам Нужна Одна Победа) by Bulat Shalvovich Okudzhava
 March Hero (Марш "Герой")
 We are the Army of the People (Мы Армия Народа) by Georgy Viktorovich Mavsesya
 Crew is One Family (Экипаж - одна семья) by Viktor Vasilyevich Pleshak
 On the Road (В Путь) by Vasily Pavlovich Solovyov-Sedoy
 Victory Day (День Победы) by David Fyodorovich Tukhmanov

 Mobile Column
 General Miloradovich (Марш "Генерал Милорадович") by Valery Khalilov
 Triumph of the Winners (Триумф Победителей)
 "Katyusha" by Matvey Blanter
 March Victory (Марш «Победа») by Albert Mikhailovich Arutyunov
 Ballad of a Soldier (Баллада о Солдате) by Vasily Pavlovich Solovyov-Sedoy

 Flypast Column
 Air March (Авиамарш) by Yuliy Abramovich Khait
 March Airplanes – First of all (Марш "Первым делом самолёты") by Vasili-Solovyov-Sedoi
 Air March (Авиамарш) by Yuliy Abramovich Khait

 Conclusion
 Long Live our State (Да здравствует наша держава) by Boris Alexandrov
 Song of the Russian Army (Песня о Российской Армии) by Alexander Alexandrov

Criticism 
The parade has been criticized for returning to the Cold War-like display of weapons. Upon receiving personal criticism, Prime Minister Vladimir Putin stated the following: "This is not saber-rattling. We do not threaten anyone and are not going to do this, we do not impose anything on anyone". The military also allocated more than 1.3 billion rubles to the parade, many of which included the stones and asphalt concrete pavement for the mobile column, which came under criticism by opposition sources as well.

References

External links 

 Parade repetition photos
 Aviation photos

Moscow Victory Day Parades
Moscow Victory Day Parade
Articles containing video clips
2008 in military history
2008 in Moscow
May 2008 events in Russia